Lan Tianye (3 May 1927 – 8 June 2022) was a Chinese actor and painter. Lan was noted for his roles as Jiang Ziya in the television series The Investiture of the Gods.

Life

Early life
Lan was born Wang Runsen in Raoyang County, Hebei (then Zhili) on 3 May 1927.

Acting career
Wang became a drama actor in 1944. Wang graduated from National Beiping Art School. He joined the Communist Party of China on 23 September 1945. In 1948, during the Chinese Civil War, Wang defected to liberated areas, and changed his name to Lan Tianye.

Lan entered the Beijing People's Art Theatre in 1952.

In 1962, Lan learned Chinese painting from Li Kuchan and Xu Linlu.

During the Cultural Revolution, Lan paused acting.

Lan made his TV series debut in The Last Emperor (1983), playing Zaifeng, Prince Chun, alongside Chen Daoming and Zhu Lin.

Lan first rose to prominence in 1990 for playing Jiang Ziya in the epic fantasy television series The Investiture of the Gods, adapted from Xu Zhonglin's classical novel of the same title. The series reached number one in the ratings when it aired in China.

In August 1996, Lan held a personal exhibition in Fukuoka, Japan.

In 2003, at the age of 76, Lan had a supporting role in The Proof Of Memories, a historical television series starring Yihong Duan, Bae Soo-bin and Li Guangjie.

On 9 November 2013, Lan won the Lifetime Achievement Award at the 13th China Drama Festival.

Death
On 8 June 2022, Lan died from pancreatic cancer in Beijing, at the age of 95.

Personal life
In 1954 Lan married Di Xin (1927 – 17 November 2018), who was a dramatic actress.

Filmography

Film

Television

Awards
 13th China Drama Festival - Lifetime Achievement Award (2013)
 July 1 Medal (2021)

References

1927 births
2022 deaths
People from Hengshui
Male actors from Hebei
Chinese male film actors
Chinese male television actors
Chinese male stage actors
20th-century Chinese male actors